Namatjira Drive is a designated state route in the Northern Territory of Australia. Strictly touristic, it runs through West MacDonnell National Park. Like Larapinta Drive, from which it branches off, it is part of the Red Centre Way. Namatjira Drive is named after Albert Namatjira (1902–1959), one of the most famous Aboriginal painters, who was born in Hermannsburg.

See also

References

Roads in the Northern Territory